Kumodraž is an urban neighborhood of Belgrade, Serbia. It is located in Belgrade's municipality of Voždovac.

Location 
Kumodraž is located in the central-eastern part of the municipality, in the lower section of the Kumodraž field (Kumodraško polje), in the valley of the creek of Kumodraški potok. Eastern and southern borders of the neighborhood are marked by a series of hills: Torlak, Golo Brdo, Stražarska Kosa, and the Kumodraž area is a source of many other creeks apart from the one that gave its name to the neighborhood: Rakovički potok (flows through the neighborhoods of Selo Rakovica and Rakovica), Lipica (Jajinci), Zavojnička reka (a tributary to the Bolečica river), Bubanj potok (flows through Bubanj Potok, also a tributary to the Bolečica), Kamena voda, etc. To the north, Kumodraž is bordered by the neighborhood of Voždovac, to the north-west by Veliki Mokri Lug and to the east by Jajinci.

Population 
Population of Kumodraž by the official censuses of population:

 1921 - 1,321
 1971 - 8,547
 2002 - 13,004 (Kumodraž, 5,405; Kumodraž I, 3,631; Kumodraž II 3,968)
 2011 - 13,343 (Kumodraž, 6,064; Kumodraž I, 3,852; Kumodraž II 3,427)

Characteristics 

A Roman aqueduct used to conduct water from the Kumodraž Hill. At some point it was joining the aqueduct from the Mokri Lug Hill, and then continued further to the Singidunum castrum. Both Mokri Lug and Kumodraž are hills, so the natural inclination allowed for the water to flow downhill to Singidunum.

During the pre-World War I period, Kumodraž had its own municipality which stretched north to the eastern outskirts of Belgrade, comprising outer city suburbs, today neighborhoods, like Dušanovac.

Kumodraž used to be a small, agricultural village far from downtown Belgrade, but after the 1960s the population boosted as it was case in almost all Belgrade's suburbs at the time. In the 1970s Kumodraž was administratively declared a local community ("mesna zajednica") within the municipality of Voždovac (part of the Belgrade City proper, uža teritorija grada), rather than being a separate settlement. Today, Kumodraž makes one continuous built up area, even though it is about 10 kilometers away from downtown. It is divided into several sub-neighborhoods: Kumodraž, Kumodraž I, Kumodraž II and Torlak.

One of the most important Serbian army leaders in modern history, vojvoda Stepa Stepanović, was born in Kumodraž in 1856 and his birthplace is turned into memorial-house dedicated to him, and the nearby woods is named Stepin Lug ("Stepa's grove"). In addition, the main street in Kumodraž is named Vojvode Stepe (though it begins much closer to downtown, at Autokomanda).

There is a Church of the Holy Trinity in the neighborhood. Next to it is a small cemetery which hosts the memorial to the Serbian soldiers killed during the short Austro-Hungarian occupation of Belgrade in the late 1914, within the scopes of the World War I. A memorial was erected on the location of the 1914-1915 seat of the Belgrade Defense Headquarters.

Old Meyhane in located in the central part of the former village. It was built in 1865 as the Ottoman watchpost along the Kragujevac Road. Serbian government later adapted it into the gendarmerie post while in World War I it was turned into the mayhane and then into the military hospital. Later it became kafana, grocery store and library of the "Vojvoda Stepa" elementary school. In time, the arcade porch was replaced with the architrave one and the roof shingles were replaced with the proper roof tiles. It was placed under the preliminary state protection, but became derelict in time.

Kumodraž I 
Central and western extension of the neighborhood, the core of the modern settlement of Kumodraž. It extends into Kumodraž II on the east, Kumodraž II on the north and Torlak on the north-west. Connected to Belgrade by the bus lines 33 and 39.

Kumodraž II 
Northern extension of the neighborhood, which makes urban connection to the neighborhood of Voždovac is named Kumodraž II. It is a modern sub-neighborhood, located in the area marked by the elbow turn of the Kumodraška street and the street of Vojvode Stepe. It makes a direct extension of the Voždovac's industrial zone along the Kumodraška street. Connected to Belgrade by the bus line 25.

Torlak 
The entire western section of Kumodraž is a sub-neighborhood of Torlak. It was named after the 308 meters-high hill of Torlak, which was very important in the military operations for the defense of Belgrade in World War I.

The surrounding area is forested, with wildlife including roe deer, wild boar and red fox. Animals occasionally descend into the lower, urbanized neighborhoods, like Stepa Stepanović. With the expansion of the population of jackals in the outskirts of Belgrade since the 2000s, the jackals were reported in Kumodraž in the spring of 2022.

The Institute of Virology, Vaccines and Sera "Torlak", the Medicines and Medical Devices Agency of Serbia, and Belgrade University Faculty of Pharmacy are all located in Torlak. In 2021, construction of the new biomedical and higher learning facility across the already existing medical complex was announced. The "BIO 4 Campus" will be built on the location of military complex, which will be demolished. The designs were selected in January 2022. The complex will include the relocated Faculty of Pharmacy, Belgrade University Faculty of Biology, and the "Torlak" institute, but also a science and technology park, Center of Ideas, Center for Industrial Development, "Minglarijum" business-commercial center, hospitality venues, etc.

It was originally announced that the "innovation hub" would cover  and host 1,300 students. In April 2022 this was enlarged to almost . Construction is planned for 2023, while already in 2024 the campus should become operational. It will be patterned after the Imperial College's campus White City, in London. Project was then enlarged again in July 2022, when the government said the complex will host 1,200 professors and researchers, and 4,000 students. Construction was planned to last for 18 months, the works should finish in 2025, and the total cost will reach €290 million (€190 million for construction, €100 million for equipment).

References

Sources 
 Mala Prosvetina Enciklopedija, First edition (1959), Vol.I; Prosveta;

Neighborhoods of Belgrade